Progress M-60, identified by NASA as Progress 25P, was a Progress spacecraft used to resupply the International Space Station. It was a Progress-M 11F615A55 spacecraft, with the serial number 360.

Launch
Progress M-60 was launched by a Soyuz-U carrier rocket from Site 1/5 at the Baikonur Cosmodrome. Launch occurred at 03:25:36 UTC on 12 May 2007.

Docking
The spacecraft docked with the Aft port of the Zvezda module at 05:10 UTC on 15 May. It remained docked for 127 days before undocking at 00:36:51 UTC on 19 September 2007. Following undocking it conducted research as part of the Plazma-Progress programme for a week prior to being deorbited. It was deorbited at 19:01 UTC on 25 September 2007. The spacecraft burned up in the atmosphere over the Pacific Ocean, with any remaining debris landing in the ocean at around 19:47 UTC.

Progress M-60 carried supplies to the International Space Station, including food, water and oxygen for the crew and equipment for conducting scientific research.

See also

 List of Progress flights
 Uncrewed spaceflights to the International Space Station

References

Spacecraft launched in 2007
Progress (spacecraft) missions
Spacecraft which reentered in 2007
Supply vehicles for the International Space Station
Spacecraft launched by Soyuz-U rockets